Kolotilovo is a rural locality (a village) in Sosnovskoye Rural Settlement, Vologodsky District, Vologda Oblast, Russia. The population was 7 as of 2002. There is 1 street.

Geography 
The distance to Vologda is 61 km, to Novlenskoye is 1 km. Chekshevo, Romanovo, Kurovo, Perkhuryevo, Dmitriyevskoye, Novlenskoye are the nearest rural localities.

References 

Rural localities in Vologodsky District